Russell Morris is the second studio album by Australian singer songwriter Russell Morris and first on label Wizard Records and was released in November 1975.
It features re-recording of two of Morris' previous hits; "Wings of an Eagle" and "Sweet, Sweet Love" as well as 8 new tracks penned by Morris.
The lead single "Let's Do It"/"Don't Rock the Boat" peaked at number 30, whilst the album peaked at number 14 on the Kent Music Report chart in November 1975.

Track listing

Credits
 Arranged By [Strings], Conductor [Strings] – Jimmy Wisner
 Art Direction – Acy R. Lehman
 Artwork – Olive Alpert, Carl Dellacroce
 Backing Vocals – Barbara Massey, Carl Hall, Tasha Thomas
 Bass – Will Lee
 Drums – Rick Marotta
 Engineer – Harry Maslin
 Engineer [Assistant] – Howie Lindeman, Kevin Herron, Ted Spencer
 Guitar – David Spinozza, Don Thomas, Hugh McCracken, Russell Morris, Vinnie Bell
 Horns – George Opalsky, Michael Brecker, Randy Brecker
 Keyboards – Jim Wisner, Ken Archer
 Percussion – Arthur Jenkins
 Strings – The Al Brown String Section

Charts

References

Russell Morris albums
1975 albums
RCA Records albums